Billy Edwards may refer to:
 Billy Edwards (boxer), English boxer
 Billy Edwards (footballer, born 1895), Welsh footballer
 Billy Edwards (footballer, born 1952), English footballer

See also
 Bill Edwards (disambiguation)
 William Edwards (disambiguation)